Ephydatia muelleri is a species of Ephydatia.

This species is native to Europe and Northern America.

Synonym (basionym): Spongilla muelleri Lieberkühn, 1856.

References

Spongillidae